Relativity Suite is a free-jazz LP by Don Cherry on Jazz Composer's Orchestra Records  which was released in 1973.

Background
Having appeared on the first two JCOA records by Michael Mantler and Carla Bley, Cherry was commissioned to write the third one in 1970. He used many of the same musicians who contributed to the first two records  and molded into a suite a string of the pieces he'd been composing and performing in the previous few years. Studying with Pandit Pran Nath, Cherry was increasingly using Indian karnatic singing in his recordings and concerts and he starts the album with a similarly derived chant."

Reception

Jazz critic Scott Yanow wrote: "Highlights include Selene Fung's lovely work on the ching, a Chinese koto-like instrument, and Ed Blackwell's exuberant New Orleans marching patterns on the concluding number. While not as breathtaking or cohesive as his Eternal Rhythm, Relativity Suite almost matches that release in its first half and contains many a worthwhile joy."

In a New York Times review of a live performance preceding the recording session, John S. Wilson described the music as "a mixture of charming, folklike melodies with a distinctly African tinge, of strong, compelling rhythms and, as occasional counter point, excursions into the clamorous, shrieking fury characteristic of avant-garde jazz." He stated: "The work itself and Mr. Cherry's conception of its presentation are so kaleidoscopic that a single hearing is simply an introduction to the materials used. It is music that can, and should, be heard repeatedly, not only for the variations that Mr. Cherry develops from performance to performance, but also for the rich lode of lyrical beauty and rhythmic stimulation with which he has filled it."

Writing for The Free Jazz Collective, Stef Gijssels noted that, with Relativity Suite, "Instrumental perfection and precision were not [Cherry's] primary focus, but rather the creation of a sonic universe that was new, global, inclusive with the ambition to create something universal and spiritual, not imposed out of some cerebral and abstract concept, but grown organically from the already existing sounds of many cultures."

Track listing
"Tantra" – 8:00
"Mali Doussn'gouni" – 5:40
"Desireless" – 1:22
"The Queen of Tung-T'ing Lake" – 4:30
"Trans-Love Airways" – 6:50
"Infinite Gentleness" – 3:22
"March of the Hobbits" – 3:38

Personnel
Don Cherry -  composer, conductor, trumpet, conch, voice, percussion
Charles Brackeen – soprano saxophone, alto saxophone, voice
Carlos Ward – alto saxophone, voice
Frank Lowe – tenor sax, voice
Dewey Redman – tenor sax, voice
Sharon Freeman – French horn
Brian Trentham – trombone
Jack Jeffers – tuba
Leroy Jenkins – violin
Joan Kalisch – viola
Nan Newton – viola
Pat Dixon – cello
Jane Robertson – cello
Charlie Haden – bass
Carla Bley – piano
Ed Blackwell – drums
Paul Motian - drums, percussion
Moki Cherry – tambura (Trans-Love Airwars)
Selene Fung – ching

Production
Producer: Don Cherry and the Jazz Composer's Orchestra
Publisher: Eternal River Music (BMI)
Engineer: Eddie Korvin
Studio: Blue Rock Studio, Greene Street, Manhattan, New York
Cover: Quilt designed and handmade by Moki Cherry photographed by Gregory Reeve
Back cover photography: Don and Eagle Eye Cherry by Jonathan Sa’ada

External links
Article by jazz journalist Howard Mandel 
Jazz Composer's Orchestra at All Music []

References 

1973 albums
Don Cherry (trumpeter) albums
Jazz Composer's Orchestra albums
JCOA Records albums